Satyavrat Chaturvedi (born 13 January 1950) is an Indian politician. He is a former member of the Indian National Congress party.

He was elected to Lok Sabha from Khajuraho in 1999. He was a Member of the Parliament of India, representing Madhya Pradesh in the Rajya Sabha, the upper house of the Parliament. He was the chairman of the select committee on the Lokpal bill in Rajya sabha during the UPA II government.

He is alumnus of Sainik School Rewa.

Early life
Chaturvedi was born in Chhatarpur, Madhya Pradesh, to Baburam Chaturvedi and Vidyawati Chaturvedi. His mother had been elected to Lok Sabha from Khajuraho twice.

References

External links
 Profile on Rajya Sabha website
 
 

Indian National Congress politicians from Madhya Pradesh
1950 births
People from Chhatarpur
Living people
India MPs 1999–2004
Sainik School alumni
Rajya Sabha members from Uttarakhand
Rajya Sabha members from Madhya Pradesh
Lok Sabha members from Madhya Pradesh
Madhya Pradesh MLAs 1980–1985
Madhya Pradesh MLAs 1993–1998